Sar Dahi (also Romanized as Sar Dāḩī, Sardāḩī, and Sar Dāhī) is a village in Veys Rural District, Veys District, Bavi County, Khuzestan Province, Iran. At the 2006 census, its population was 216, including a total of 30 families.

References 

Populated places in Bavi County